The Penalty is a 1941 American crime film directed by Harold S. Bucquet and written by Harry Ruskin and John C. Higgins. The film stars Edward Arnold, Lionel Barrymore, Marsha Hunt, Robert Sterling, Gene Reynolds and Emma Dunn. The film was released on March 14, 1941, by Metro-Goldwyn-Mayer.

Plot
A gangster hires men to do some work, states they are going to the bank, then holds up the bank (unknownst to the workers). The gangster, "Stuff" Nelson, leaves the workers wondering what happened.

A 16-year-old boy visits his father's girlfriend, who loves furs. Roosty loves his father, who is a gangster and does not think twice about shooting people. At a cabin in the woods, there is a shootout and the girlfriend is killed. Roosty, the boy, is captured and sent to reform school. He is later sent to live with a family on a farm and has a hard time adjusting, but comes to love and care about the family.

Stuff Nelson is able to locate his boy. The family tries to talk him out of leaving. The boy finally stands up to Stuff and refuses to leave. Stuff is immediately shot by the police.

Cast 
Edward Arnold as Martin 'Stuff' Nelson
Lionel Barrymore as 'Grandpop' Logan
Marsha Hunt as Katherine Logan
Robert Sterling as Edward 'Ted' McCormick
Gene Reynolds as Russell 'Roosty' Nelson
Emma Dunn as 'Ma' McCormick
Veda Ann Borg as Julie Jackson
Richard Lane as FBI Agent Craig
Gloria DeHaven as Anne Logan
Grant Mitchell as Judge
Phil Silvers as 'Grapevine' Hobo
Warren Ashe as Jay
William Haade as Johnny Van Brook
Ralph Byrd as FBI Agent Brock
Edgar Barrier as 'Burnsy' Burns

References

External links 
 

1941 films
American crime films
1941 crime films
Metro-Goldwyn-Mayer films
Films directed by Harold S. Bucquet
American black-and-white films
1940s English-language films
1940s American films